Valentin Eduard Becker (20 November 1814 Würzburg - 25 January 1890 Würzburg) was a German composer.

Biography
Becker became known as a composer in Würzburg for popular male choruses (Das Kirchlein and others). He also wrote several masses and two operas, entitled Die Bergknappen and Der Deserteur.

References

1814 births
1890 deaths
Musicians from Würzburg
19th-century German composers